Robin Jacobsson (born 28 March 1990) is a Swedish footballer who plays for Assyriska FF as a defender.

References

External links

1990 births
Living people
Association football forwards
Trelleborgs FF players
Assyriska FF players
Allsvenskan players
Superettan players
Swedish footballers
BW 90 IF players